Gardnos crater (Gardnos krateret) is a meteorite impact crater in Nesbyen municipality in Viken county, Norway.  It is located inside Meteorite Park (Meteorittparken) at Gardnos  10 km north of the town of Nesbyen.

At first this site was believed to be a volcanic crater, but in 1990 two geologists, Johan Naterstad and Johannes A. Dons, confirmed that it was in fact formed by meteorite impact.

The original bedrock in the area was fractured and a powder of crushed rocks was forced into all the fractures. This is the origin of the peculiar rock in this area. It is possible to drive into the centre of the crater, which makes the Gardnos crater one of the world's most accessible meteorite craters. There are two trails through the surrounding natural region, with information signs describing the unique geology of the area.

References

External links 
Meteorittparken website
Earth Impact Database

Cambrian impact craters
Impact craters of Norway
Landforms of Viken (county)